Oberweser was a municipality in the district of Kassel, in Hesse, Germany. On January 1, 2020, Oberweser merged with neighboring Wahlsburg to form the municipality of Wesertal.

References

Kassel (district)
Reinhardswald
Former municipalities in Hesse